Bump in the Night is the second album by former Small Faces and Faces keyboardist Ian McLagan, released in 1981 on Mercury Records. Retaining Johnny Lee Schell from his debut, the album saw McLagan form the first edition of The Bump Band for the recording of the album, the line-up being McLagan (vocal, keyboards, guitar), Schell (guitar, vocal), Ricky Fataar (drums, piano, percussion, bass, vocal) and Ray Ohara (bass). The album is harder-edged than McLagan's others, with less emphasis on keyboards and more on guitars. As on his debut, his former bandmate Ron Wood appears as does saxophonist Bobby Keys. The album was McLagan's last solo album for nearly twenty years, though an extended play, Last Chance to Dance, came out in 1985 on Barking Dog Records.

Track listing
All tracks composed by Ian McLagan; except where indicated

 "Little Girl" (McLagan, Ron Wood) (3:03)
 "Alligator" (2:43)
 "If It's Lovin' You Want" (McLagan, Johnny Lee Schell) (3:34)
 "Casualty" (3:36)
 "Told a Tale on You" (McLagan, Ricky Fataar, Ray Ohara, Schell) (3:07)
 "Judy, Judy, Judy" (3:22)
 "So Lucky" ( 3:18)
 "Rebel Walk" (2:59)
 "Not Running Away" (McLagan, Fataar, Rob Fraboni) (3:45)
 "Boy's Gonna Get It" (3:57)

Personnel
 Ian McLagan - lead vocals, organ, piano, guitars
 Johnny Lee Schell - lead guitar, vocals
 Ricky Fataar - drums, piano, bass, percussion, vocals
 Ray Ohara - bass
with
 Ron Wood - "duelling" guitar, bass (1)
 Renée Geyer - backing vocals (7)
 Bobby Keys - tenor saxophone (9)
Technical
Tim Kramer - engineer
Mike Doud - art direction, design
Gary Panter - cover painting and illustrations 
The information above can be found in the CD booklet of Bump in the Night, available from Maniac Records.

1981 albums
Ian McLagan albums
Albums produced by Rob Fraboni
Mercury Records albums